The following is a list of the 21 cantons of the Maine-et-Loire department, in France, following the French canton reorganisation which came into effect in March 2015:

 Angers-1
 Angers-2
 Angers-3
 Angers-4
 Angers-5
 Angers-6
 Angers-7
 Beaufort-en-Anjou
 Beaupréau-en-Mauges
 Chalonnes-sur-Loire
 Chemillé-en-Anjou
 Cholet-1
 Cholet-2
 Doué-en-Anjou
 Longué-Jumelles
 Mauges-sur-Loire
 Les Ponts-de-Cé
 Saumur
 Segré-en-Anjou Bleu
 Sèvremoine
 Tiercé

References